The New York Album is an album by saxophonist Lee Konitz's Quartet which was recorded in 1987 and released on the Italian Soul Note label. The album marked Konitz's 70th album release and his 39th Studio album.

Critical reception

The Allmusic review stated "For this lovely and swinging date from 1988, Konitz conjures up a fresh array of solo moods on a mix of self-penned material, contemporary originals, and standards. Backed by a stellar band made up of bassist Marc Johnson, pianist Harold Danko, and drummer Adam Nussbaum, Konitz pleasantly surprises with his mercurial phrases, varied tonal palette, and unique rhythmic sense ... A very enjoyable collection".

Track listing 
All compositions by Lee Konitz except where noted.
 "Candlelight Shadows" (Harold Danko) – 9:34
 "Everybody's Song But My Own" (Kenny Wheeler) – 7:23
 "Limehouse Blues" (Philip Braham, Douglas Furber) – 5:22
 "Monkian Round" – 3:24
 "September Waltz" (Frank Wunsch) – 7:01
 "Dream Variation" – 4:35
 "Invitation" (Bronisław Kaper, Paul Francis Webster) – 8:56

Personnel 
Lee Konitz – alto saxophone
Harold Danko – piano
Marc Johnson – bass
Adam Nussbaum – drums

References 

Lee Konitz albums
1988 albums
Black Saint/Soul Note albums